Quipper may refer to:
someone who makes quips
Quipper (company), an education technology company
Quipper (programming language), used in quantum programming
Quipper (Dungeons & Dragons), a monster in Dungeons & Dragons

See also 
 Kuiper (disambiguation)
 Kipper (disambiguation)
 Quip (disambiguation)